The 2016 Claro Open Medellín was a professional tennis tournament played on outdoor clay courts. It is the 13th edition of the tournament. It was part of the 2016 ATP Challenger Tour. It took place in Medellín, Colombia, between 26 September and 1 October 2016.

Singles main draw entrants

Seeds 

 1 Rankings as of 19 September 2016.

Other entrants 
The following players received wild cards into the singles main draw:
  Gregorio Cordonnier
  Juan Sebastián Gómez
  Daniel Elahi Galán
  Sergio Luis Hernández Ramírez

The following players received entry as alternates:
  Nicolás Barrientos
  José Pereira

The following players received entry from the qualifying draw:
  Orlando Luz 
  Fernando Romboli 
  Nicolas Santos
  Marcelo Zormann

The following player received entry as a lucky loser:
  Bruno Sant'anna

Champions

Men's singles

 Facundo Bagnis def.   Caio Zampieri 6–7(3–7), 7–5, 6–2.

Men's doubles

 Alejandro Falla /  Eduardo Struvay def.  André Ghem /  Juan Lizariturry 6–3, 6–2.

External links 
 Official website

2016
2016
2016 in Colombian tennis
Claro Open Medellin